Akash Ganga is the 124-member sky diving team of the Indian Air Force. It was created in August 1987. Akash Ganga can be roughly translated in Hindi as "The Ganga of the sky", an ancient Hindi name for the Milky Way as viewed from the Earth.

Formation 

Akasha Ganga was started in the 1970s as practice to prepare for war. Its usage in the Agra Air Force Station began in 1987.

The Akash Ganga is made up of teachers from the Paratrooper Training School.

References

1987 establishments in India
Indian Air Force
Military sport in India